The 2023–24 Champions Hockey League will be the ninth season of the Champions Hockey League, a European ice hockey tournament. The tournament will be competed by 24 teams, with qualification being on sporting merits only. Apart from the reigning champion, the six founding leagues will be represented by three teams each, while five "challenge leagues" will be represented by one team each.

Format changes
Starting from the 2023–24 season the format will be changed. The number of teams will be reduced from 32 to 24 teams. The group stage will be replaced with the regular season in which teams will play six games each, with the teams being ranked in overall standings and 16 best-ranked teams advancing to the playoffs.

In the regular season draw, teams will be allocated into four pots featuring six teams each. The seeding will depend on the teams’ achievements in their national leagues and the respective league’s standing in the CHL league ranking. Each team will be drawn against two teams from each of the other three pots.

In the playoffs, teams will form pairs based on the overall regular season standings.

For the first time since the 2015–16 season, the IIHF Continental Cup winners did not get a wild card spot.

Team allocation
A total of 24 teams from different European first-tier leagues will participate in the league. Besides the title holders Tappara 18 teams from the six founding leagues, as well as the national champions from Denmark, France, Norway, Slovakia and the United Kingdom will participate. 
The qualification criteria for national leagues is based on the following rules:

 CHL champions
 National league champions (play-off winners)
 Regular season winners
 Regular season runners-up
 Regular season third-placed team

Note: the national league champions of the United Kingdom are determined following the regular season.

Teams

References

 
2023
Champions